Hans Blöcker (April 17, 1898 – June 15, 1988) was a German politician of the Christian Democratic Union (CDU) and former member of the German Bundestag.

Life 
Blöcker, who joined the CDU in 1953, was a member of the state parliament in Schleswig-Holstein from 1954 to 31 December 1957, where he represented the Neumünster constituency. On November 8, 1954, he succeeded Kai-Uwe von Hassel, who had been elected Prime Minister of Schleswig-Holstein, in the German Bundestag, of which he was a member until 1969. In 1954 and 1965 he entered the Bundestag via the Schleswig-Holstein state list and otherwise as a directly elected member of parliament for the Segeberg - Neumünster constituency.

Literature

References

1898 births
1988 deaths
Members of the Bundestag for Schleswig-Holstein
Members of the Bundestag 1965–1969
Members of the Bundestag 1961–1965
Members of the Bundestag 1957–1961
Members of the Bundestag 1953–1957
Members of the Bundestag for the Christian Democratic Union of Germany
Members of the Landtag of Schleswig-Holstein